The New Korean Orthography was a spelling reform used in North Korea from 1948 to 1954. It added five consonants and one vowel letter to the Hangul alphabet, supposedly making it a more morphophonologically "clear" approach to the Korean language.

History
After the establishment of the North Korean government in 1945, the North Korean Provisional People's Committee began a language planning campaign on the Soviet model. Originally, both North Korean and South Korean Hangul script was based on the Unified Plan promulgated in 1933 under the Japanese. The goals of the independent North Korean campaign were to increase literacy, re-standardize Hangul to form a "New Korean" that could be used as a cultural weapon of revolution, and eliminate the use of Hanja (Chinese characters). The study of Russian was also made compulsory from middle school onward, and communist terminology—such as Workers' Party, People's Army, and Fatherland Liberation War—were rapidly assimilated into Korean. The ban on Hanja in 1949 (excepting parenthetical references in scientific and technical publications) was part of a language purification movement which sought to replace Sino-Korean vocabulary and loanwords from Japanese with native neologisms on the grounds that they were "reactionary" and separated the literary intelligentsia from the masses. New dictionaries, monolingual and bilingual Russian-Korean, were to be based on the concept of "self-reliance" (juche); place names and personal names modeled after Chinese naming practices were also purged and replaced with socialist concepts.

In 1948, the New Korean Orthography was promulgated, along with the Standard Language Orthography Dictionary. The Communist Party of Korea claimed that this New Orthography was the first in Korean history to represent the language of the proletariat. The only publications to use the New Korean Orthography were the linguistics journal Korean Language Research and the 1949 Korean Grammar. The language standardization efforts were interrupted by the Korean War and hampered by Kim Il Sung's disapproval of the new orthography. In March 1958, the new orthography's creator, Kim Tu Bong, was purged from the Party, and linguistics journals began publishing attacks on him and his system. From then on, proposals for script reform were restricted to the idea of writing Hangul horizontally, rather than in syllable blocks. Linguistic journals also continued to attack "foreignisms" from Chinese and English (e.g., pai pai/bai bai , "bye bye"). In the 1960s, Kim Il Sung issued a directive that would bind all future language planning to Korean ethnic nationalism, saying that "people of the same racial make-up, the same culture, living in the same territory... [have a] need for a nationalistic, pure standard". Thus, Pyongan dialect was chosen as the standard dialect for North Korean, purely for the reason that it was considered less "contaminated" by foreign cultures and capitalists. The legacy of the New Korean Orthography lies in North Korea's modern use of Hangul, which reflects morphology more than pronunciation as it does in the South.

Contents

The reason for the reform is that some Korean roots change form and therefore cannot be written with a consistent spelling using standard hangul. Three were created de novo by modifying existing letters, two ( and ) were obsolete letters, and one is a numeral.

Another example is the root of the verb "to heal", which has the form   before a consonant, as in   but the form  before a vowel, as in   In some cases, there is an epenthetic  vowel before a consonant suffix, as in   In New Orthography, this variable root is written as an invariable , and the epenthetic vowel is not written:  NA’.DA for    NA’.L for    NA’.A for  

As with all letters in North Korea, the names follow the formula CiŭC.

There were other changes that made the orthography more morphemic, without requiring the addition of new letters. For example, in the word normally spelled  (top example in image at right), the politeness morpheme  is separated out in its own block. Such spellings can be found in medieval documents, but were not normally seen in the 20th century.

The attributive   morpheme at the ends of adjectives is also placed in a separate block, and the occasional epenthetic  that appears before it is not written, unlike standard   A morphemic  is retained before this ending:  HA.YAH.DA  "is white",  HA.YAH.N  "white" (standard  HA.YAN).  CHOH.DA  "is good",  CHOH.N  "good" (standard  CHOH.ŬN).

See also

 Revised Romanization

Notes
 Silence
 Makes the following consonant tense, as a final ㅅ does
 In standard orthography, combines with a following vowel as ㅘ, ㅙ, ㅚ, ㅝ, ㅞ, ㅟ
 In standard orthography, combines with a following vowel as ㅑ, ㅒ, ㅕ, ㅖ, ㅛ, ㅠ

References

External links 
 Proposal to add the "6 letters" (Hangul Jamo)

Korean language in North Korea
Korean writing system
Orthography reform
Writing systems introduced in 1948
1948 establishments in North Korea
History of North Korea